The Krossnessundet Bridge is a cantilever bridge in Alver Municipality in Vestland county, Norway. The bridge connects the islands of Holsnøy and Flatøy on the north side of the Salhusfjorden. The village of Krossneset is located at the eastern end of the bridge. Opened in 1978, it is part of County Road 564.

References

Road bridges in Vestland
Alver (municipality)
Bridges completed in 1978
1978 establishments in Norway